Zhora Kryzhovnikov (born 14 February 1979) is a Russian film director, screenwriter and producer.

Filmography

As director
 Big Difference (2008)
 A Lucky Buy (2010)
 A Сurse (2012)
 Kiss Them All! (2013)
 The Kitchen (2013)
 Kiss Them All! 2 (2014)
 Unintentionally (2014)
 The Very Best Day (2015)
 Yolki 6 (2017)
 Call DiCaprio! (2018)
 Ice 2 (2020)

As screenwriter
 A Lucky Buy (2010)
 A Curse (2012)
 Kiss Them All! (2013)
 Kiss Them All! 2 (2014)
 Unintentionally (2014)
 The Very Best Day (2015)
 Life Is Ahead (2017)
 Hasta que la boda nos separe  (2018)
 Call DiCaprio! (2018)
 Yolki 7 (2018)

As producer
 A Lucky Buy (2010)
 The Very Best Day (2015)

References

External links

Living people
Russian film directors
1979 births
Russian screenwriters
Russian Academy of Theatre Arts alumni
Gerasimov Institute of Cinematography alumni
Recipients of the Nika Award